St. Henry's Marist College, formerly known as St Henry's Marist Brothers' College is a co-educational private school with a Catholic foundation in Glenwood, Durban, KwaZulu-Natal, South Africa.

History
Saint Marcellin Champagnat, a young priest in rural south-east France, founded the Marist Brothers to educate the poor. The Brothers then spread to many parts of the world, arriving in Cape Town in 1867. In 1929, (after the Brothers had opened St. Charles College, Pietermaritzburg), the Brothers opened St Henry's with Brother Paul Eusterius as principal. Since then the school has greatly expanded, particularly under the previous principal, Dr Anthony Akal, who was at the helm from 1982 until 2011. The school has a wonderful aspect, along the Ridge above Durban with a view over the City to the bay on the one side and inland towards the Valley of a Thousand Hills on the other.

The school started as a day school for boys, but has recently become co-educational. The Brothers gradually withdrew from the teaching life of the school (which is now under lay control) but still play a major part in the religious aspects of the school, upon which the College prides itself. The emphasis on religion, discipline and a strong sense of a "school-family" add to the school's appeal.

The school motto is Omnia Vincite, which means Conquer all difficulties.

Recent history

Facilities

General facilities
The school recently refurbished the tuck shop. The school also has four fields, an amphitheater, an observatory, and a state-of-the-art Learning Resources Center, which contains a library section, teaching venues, a computer room and a Long Distance Audio Visual room. Many of the school's classrooms were recently equipped with Smartboards.

The school also has a gymnasium, chapel and two laboratories. The Foundation Phase playground and school gardens have also been significantly improved.

Recent expansions

In 2010, the College moved its Art Department to a large house next to the school. The ground floor of this house was converted into a teaching venue complete with a small library, classroom, office and veranda for working on large projects. An Academic Support Center has been launched on the upper floors of the house.

The College also recently expanded its Music School, which now contains four practice rooms, and a main teaching room. Each room has been soundproofed, and the syllabus has been broadened to include music as an official school subject.

The school is a member of the Durban Youth Council, and has a strong representation in the organisation.

Uniform
The school colours are gold, navy blue and platinum. These are incorporated into the uniform of each phase.

Foundation Phase (Grade 000 – 0)
Boys wear navy blue tee shirts (without the school badge) and navy blue tracksuit pants or shorts.

Girls wear sleeveless blue checked dresses with a navy blue tee shirt underneath.

Intermediate Phase (Grade 3 – 7)
Boys wear short-sleeved navy blue collar shirts, with the school badge on the front chest pocket, and navy blue shorts. Knee-length black socks with a fold-over blue band with two gold stripes are also worn. Black boys' lace-up school shoes are also worn.

Girls wear a short-sleeved checkered dress, a pattern of gold and platinum stripes. The sleeves and collar are edged in navy blue.

High School (Grade 8 – 12)
The boys wear long-sleeved or short-sleeved white shirts with the school tie. Gray trousers, grey socks and black lace-up school shoes are also worn. The school blazer, which is navy blue with gold stripes, must be worn when travelling to and from school, or in public, but may be removed during the day on the school grounds.

The girls wear long-sleeved or short-sleeved white shirts with the school tie. Gray knee-length skirts, white ankle-length socks, and black buckle shoes are worn. The same rules with regards to the blazer applies to girls.

The school blazer, badge and tie
The school blazer is single-breasted, with two silver buttons, and a small silver cuff button on each sleeve. It is navy blue with vertical gold stripes, with the school badge emblazoned onto the chest pocket.

The school badge consists of an intertwined "A" and "M" (Ave Maria) in gold, within an escutcheon. Beneath the shield is a scroll bearing the initials "M.B.D." for Marist Brothers' Durban.

The school tie is navy blue with diagonal gold stripes.

College Awards
The College may award students with Half Colours, Full Colours, Colours Blazers and Honours Blazers, for outstanding achievements in a variety of fields.

Half Colours
Half Colours may be awarded to a student who meets certain criteria, as laid down in the College's School Diary. For achieving Half Colours in a particular field, the student is presented with a Half Colours Tie, which is worn instead of the normal school tie. The Half Colours Tie is navy blue with the school badge and the field of achievement (for example, Cross Country) on it.

Full Colours
The criteria for Full Colours are far more stringent than those for Half Colours. Upon achieving Full Colours, the student is presented with a gold scroll bearing the name of the field of endeavour. This scroll is sewn onto the normal school blazer, below the school badge. Each Full Colours scroll bears a certain number of points, either 2 points or 4 points. These points are used to calculate whether an individual is qualified for a Colours Blazer.

Colours Blazer
To receive a Colours Blazer, a students must have accrued a minimum of 10 points.

Once obtained, the Colours Blazer replaces all the student's scrolls and the normal school blazer. Therefore, any existing scrolls or scrolls acquired after the student receives a Colours Blazer may not be sewn onto the Blazer. The Colours Blazer is navy blue. The Colours Blazer Badge also consists of the escutcheon and interwoven "A" and "M", but has gold laurel leaves around the shield.

Honours Blazer
To receive an Honours Blazer, a student must have received a Colours Blazer, and a Merit Scroll. The Head Boy, Head Girl and their deputies all automatically receive Honours Blazers upon their appointment.

The Honours Blazer is the College's highest award, and is not given to individuals based on their performance or achievements. It is only presented to students who show outstanding leadership qualities, and are involved in service both within the school, and in the greater community.

The Honours Blazer is navy blue with gold braiding around the sleeves, lapels and edges of the blazer. The badge for this blazer is completely different, as it is the school's individual badge, rather than the general Marist badge used worldwide.

External links
St. Henry's official site

Catholic schools in South Africa
Catholic secondary schools in South Africa
Private schools in KwaZulu-Natal
Educational institutions established in 1929
1929 establishments in South Africa
Education in Durban